Thomas Stewart Harpley (April 8, 1929 – July 21, 2015) was a Canadian football player who played for the Toronto Argonauts and Winnipeg Blue Bombers. He won the Grey Cup with Toronto in 1952. He previously played junior football for the Junior Toronto Balmy Beach Beachers. Harpley was later a chiropractor in Winnipeg,. where he died in 2015.

References

1929 births
2015 deaths
Toronto Argonauts players